metasfresh is an open source/free ERP software designed and developed for SMEs. metasfresh is an actively maintained fork of ADempiere and can be used and distributed freely. It does not require a contributor license agreement from partners or contributors. There is no closed source code, and the planning and development happen openly in the community. metasfresh was included in the Top 9 Open Source ERP to consider by opensource.com.

History 
In September 2006 the founders of metasfresh started with Open Source ERP development as early contributors in the ADempiere ERP Project. They were founding members of the ADempiere Foundation and longtime members of Functional and Technical Team at ADempiere. In industry-specific ERP projects in the SME sector they developed several new features based on ADempiere 3.5.4 and rewrote the majority of ADempiere Code to allow a more maintainable, flexible and scalable Software for midsize companies. The user base they built up demanded shorter and more reliable release cycles to allow more flexibility in providing solutions for their requirements. This, plus the already resulted gap in development compared to the latest ADempiere Codebase was the reason for the team to decide in 2015 to officially fork from ADempiere and proceed the development in a new project called metasfresh.

Since releasing the code to the public on 6 October 2015 the community and development activity has risen quickly. Despite the fork's young age, metasfresh is currently one of the most active Open Source ERP Projects worldwide according to OpenHUB Statistics.

Technology

Software & Architecture
metasfresh is written in Java, JavaScript scripting language and works with PostgreSQL  database management system. The development repository is publicly available on GitHub. It is composed of Client and Server components. The main Client is a Java Swing User Interface and available for production environments. Currently a new Web Interface is under development.

Used Technologies: 
 Web-Frontend: HTML5, PostCSS, JavaScript, React, Redux
 Java-Frontend: Java 8, Swing Java
 Application Server: Tomcat, Spring Framework, OpenJDK, JasperReports 
 Database: PostgreSQL 9.5
 Integration: ServiceMix, RabbitMQ, ActiveMQ, Camel
 API: REST, JSON, Swagger, Spring Framework, Hazelcast, Elasticsearch, Kibana
 Mobile Application: Vaadin

Business functionalities/ features

The feature List of metasfresh covers the majority of requirements of medium-sized enterprises for ERP Software and is comparable with proprietary ERP Systems.

 Enterprise Resource Planning
 Contract management
 CRM
 Supply chain management
 Distribution resource planning
 Document automation
 Manufacturing resource planning
 Accounts payable
 Accounts receivable
 General ledger
 Sales
 Purchase
 Inventory
 Bank account management
 Payments management
 Shipping management
 Multi-Tenants
 Multi-Organizations
 Multi-Language
 Multi-Currency
 Multi-Account Schema

Differences to the ADempiere Project
After the fork from Compiere, the ADempiere community followed the open-source model of the Bazaar described in Eric Raymond's article The Cathedral and the Bazaar. The community and codebase were growing fast. The development mainly relied on the architecture inherited from Compiere, which had a tight coupling to the database. The architecture in combination with fast growing complexity leads into longer taking release cycles. Additionally, the license of ADempiere is GPL 2. Open Source projects with licenses compatible to GPL 2 are decreasing, so further development will more and more have to rely on own development which is a threat to a competitive development of Open Source enterprise software.

With the fork, metasfresh is choosing a different approach. The main aims of the project are:

 Quality Assurance: Building a modern architecture and decoupling the application from the data layer. The aim is to allow to extend the automatic Testing possibilities which are a prerequisite for shorter release cycles with extending functionality.
 Legal: Completely rewriting the ADempiere code, to allow to switch the license from GPL2 to GPL3 to allow to choose among a larger amount of modern Open Source projects for further incorporation and development.
 Efficiency: Consequent usage of Tools to enable efficient work from requirements analysis over development and testing until build and deployment.
 Flexibility: Provide a highly flexible framework for business processes based on a new disposition framework which allows having functional extension points to allow external systems to bind with metasfresh ERP.

Currently, the time between stable releases including bug fixes and new features is 1 week according to the project's release notes.

See also

 Java
 JavaScript
 iDempiere, Openbravo, Adempiere, Compiere (Compiere source code family)
List of free and open source software packages

References

External links
 Official website
 metasfresh Community forum
 metasfresh Community chat
 metasfresh Documentation
 Project Code Repository
 OpenHUB Open Source Community Stats
 Open Source Directory
 Open Source Business Alliance
 Free and Open Source ERP Software for Ubuntu (in German)
 metasfresh at OpenRheinRuhr Conference (in German)

Free ERP software
Free business software
Free customer relationship management software
Free accounting software
Free software programmed in Java (programming language)
Enterprise resource planning software for Linux
ERP software
Accounting software
Customer relationship management software companies